Big A or The Big A is the nickname of the following:
 Nickname for Atlanta, Georgia
 Angel Stadium, Anaheim, California
 Big A Sign
 , that Japanese bombers sank in the attack on Pearl Harbor
 Aqueduct Racetrack, a horse racing facility in New York City
 Big Apple, nickname for New York City
 Big "A" or Charlotte Drake, a character in Pretty Little Liars